Little Bangladesh is a neighborhood in Los Angeles, California.

History
Little Bangladesh was officially designated by the City of Los Angeles in 2010. It is the cultural and culinary hub of L.A.'s Bangladeshi community.

Designation of the neighborhood as “Little Bangladesh” caused some friction with some Korean-Americans in Los Angeles, who wanted the area named as a part of Koreatown. In 2009, City Councilman Tom LaBonge opposed the neighborhood designation, and instead suggested the community erect a statue at a local park and consider neighborhood designation sometime in the future.  After neighborhood leaders organized residents for more than a year to lobby the Los Angeles City Council, Little Bangladesh received its official designation in 2010.  Signage marking the area was installed in 2011.

Geography

Little Bangladesh is four-block area along 3rd Street between Alexandria and New Hampshire Avenues.  It is a tree-lined residential community that also includes restaurants, shops and art galleries.   The neighborhood is surrounded by Koreatown.

Demographics

The 2000 census showed a Bangladeshi population of 1,700 in Los Angeles County. In 2010, the South Asian Network, a cultural and advocacy group with an office nearby, estimated the Bangladeshi population in the area at more than 20,000, based on a community mapping project it did in 2005.  Community leaders have identified the area as having a lower- to middle-income population.

See also
 The South Asian Network - An advocacy group established in 1990. 
 Little Bangladesh website

References

Bengali-American culture
Neighborhoods in Los Angeles
Central Los Angeles
Ethnic enclaves in California
Asian-American culture in Los Angeles
Ethnic groups in Los Angeles